Anatoli Grigoryevich Pata (born 30 July 1958 in Stalino, Ukrainian SSR) is a Russian football coach and a former player. He manages a Russian Amateur Football League team FC Elektroavtomatika Stavropol.

Despite playing as a goalkeeper, he scored 7 goals from the penalty kicks during his professional career.

External links
 

1958 births
Sportspeople from Donetsk
Living people
Soviet footballers
Soviet expatriate footballers
Expatriate footballers in Hungary
FC Rotor Volgograd players
FC Dynamo Stavropol players
FC Kuban Krasnodar players
Russian footballers
Russian Premier League players
Russian football managers
FC Dynamo Stavropol managers
Association football goalkeepers
FC Mashuk-KMV Pyatigorsk players